Kungur is the name of several inhabited localities in Russia.

Urban localities
Kungur, a town of the krai significance in Perm Krai

Rural localities
Kungur, Vereshchaginsky District, Perm Krai, a village in Vereshchaginsky District of Perm Krai
Kungur, Udmurt Republic, a village in Uvinsky District of the Udmurt Republic